Marie Dujardin Beaumetz Lemoine (1887–1984) was a French botanist and phycologist noted for her study of the algae Corallinales and her work at the National Museum of Natural History (France).  She married French geologist Paul Lemoine.

References 

1887 births
1984 deaths
20th-century French botanists
20th-century French women scientists
Phycologists
Women phycologists